Ahmadabad (also Romanized as Aḩmadābād) is a village in Taraznahid Rural District, in the Central District of Saveh County, Markazi Province, Iran. At the 2006 census, its population was 940, in 236 families.

References 

Populated places in Saveh County